LaSalle station is a commuter rail station operated by Exo in the borough of LaSalle in Montreal, Quebec, Canada. It opened September 4th, 2001.

It is served by  the Candiac line, and is the last station on the island of Montreal. It is located in ARTM fare zone A.

Location
The station is accessible from Highlands Avenue north of Boulevard LaSalle to the west, and Airlie Street to the east.

Bus services

References

External links 
 LaSalle Commuter Train Station Information (RTM)
 LaSalle Commuter Train Station Schedule (RTM)
 2016 STM System Map

Exo commuter rail stations
Railway stations in Montreal
LaSalle, Quebec
Railway stations in Canada opened in 2001